RW Cephei is a hypergiant variable star in the constellation Cepheus, at the edge of the Sharpless 132 HII region and close to the small open cluster Berkeley 94. One of the largest stars known, RW Cephei's radius is more than 1,000 times that of the Sun, thus larger than the orbit of Jupiter.

The temperature intermediate between the red supergiants and yellow hypergiants, and itself varying considerably, has led to it being variously considered as a red hypergiant or yellow hypergiant.

Distance 
The distance to RW Cephei has been estimated on the basis of its spectroscopic luminosity and it is assumed to be a member of the Cepheus OB1 association. The star and cluster are part of the larger star-forming region Sh 2-132 within the Orion-Cygnus arm of the Milky Way.

Variability 

RW Cephei was first discovered to be variable by Henrietta Swan Leavitt in 1907. The magnitude range was initially given as 8.2–8.8 using photographic plates, while later studies found the photographic range to be from 8.6–10.7, however they note that maxima and minima cannot be derived with any certainty. Other authors estimate an amplitude of only around 0.5 magnitudes. Modern estimates put the range of variability from 6.0 to 7.6 in the V-band. The star was designated RW in 1908, being the fifteenth discovered variable in Cepheus.

RW Cephei has been classified as a semi-regular variable star of type SRd, meaning that it is a slowly varying yellow giant or supergiant. The General Catalogue of Variable Stars gives a period of approximately 346 days taken from a 1952 study, but other studies suggest different periods and certainly no strong periodicity.

Great dimming events 
In December of 2022, the star was reported by two astronomers to be going through a great dimming, reaching a fainter than usual magnitude of 7.6. It is speculated to possibly be similar to the great dimming of Betelgeuse that happened in late 2019.

Previous observations using photographic plates taken between 1948 and 1951 reveal a similar dimming from magnitude 9.16 down to 9.5, followed by a rapid re-brightening to magnitude 8.9.

Spectrum 
RW Cephei displays many complex lines in its spectrum, many of which are stronger and more broad than usual. An initial study in 1956 focusing on the blue spectral region found many metal absorption lines with two components separated by a central maximum, attributed to emission superposed on an absorption line widened due to turbulence. The shortward absorption components were found to be significantly stronger than the longward components, caused by an outward moving shell of gas. A follow-up study in 1972 focusing on redder spectral regions found unusually strong sodium D lines too intense to be caused by the interstellar medium. The iron I line was found to be 30% stronger than in normal K-type supergiants, while the titanium I and vanadium I lines were of the same strengh or weaker. With these peculiar spectral features, the star finds no counterpart among the known hypergiants, with only Rho Cassiopeiae displaying remotely similar features.

Circumstellar material 
The star shows evidence for a significant amount of circumstellar material in its spectrum. The IRAS low resolution spectrum shows signatures of optically thick silicate emission at 10 and 18 microns, an indication for high amounts of mass loss. Silicon monoxide emission was suspected in 1982, and later confirmed using higher resolution spectra showing clear signs of emission at 4.0, 4.04 and 4.08 microns. Direct imaging in mid-infrared bands reveals the source to be extended, having an azimuthally symmetric structure similar to IRC +10420.

Spectral type 
The spectrum has been classified as early as G8 and as late as M2, but it isn't clear that there has been actual variation. In the first MK spectral atlas, it was listed M0:Ia. RW Cephei was later listed as the standard star for spectral type G8 Ia, then as the standard for K0 0-Ia. Based on the same spectra it was adjusted to the standard star for type K2 0-Ia. Molecular bands characteristic of M-class stars are seen in infrared spectra, but not always in optical spectra.

Physical properties 
The temperature of RW Cep is uncertain, with contradictory excitation strengths in the spectrum. A simple colour correlation temperature fit gives temperatures around 3,749 K, while a full spectrum fit gives a temperature of 5,018 K. Another fit using J-band spectral data and MARCS stellar models gives a temperature of  K.

A more recent study finds a somewhat lower luminosity of  assuming the distance given in Gaia DR2.

A mass loss rate of /yr has been estimated adopting a distance of 2.8 kpc.

References

K-type hypergiants
Cephei, RW
Cepheus (constellation)
212466
BD+55 2737
110504
Semiregular variable stars
G-type hypergiants
M-type hypergiants